Air Play  is a jazz compilation album by Benny Goodman consisting of performances from radio broadcasts dating between December 1936 and 1938. It was released in 1985.

Track listing 

 "I Want to Be Happy" – 2:29
 "Swing Low, Sweet Chariot" – 2:20
 "Medly: Body & Soul, Dinah" – 5:55
 "Stompin' at the Savoy" – 3:17
 "Shine" – 2:42
 "Japanese Sandman" – 2:59
 "Body and Soul" – 2:49
 "Dinah" – 2:47
 "An Apple a Day" – 2:14
 "Some of These Days" – 2:25
 "Goodbye" – 1:57
 "Chicago" – 2:30
 "Moten Swing" – 2:49
 "You're Blase'" – 2:19
 "I've Got a Pocket Full of Dreams" – 2:16
 "Stardust" – 2:41
 "Russian Lullaby" – 2:17
 "In a Mist" – 3:01
 "Margie" – 2:13
 "You Go to My Head" – 2:46
 "You're Driving Me Crazy" – 1:48
 "Lullaby in Rhythm" – 3:32
 "Bumble Stomp" – 3:02

References

1985 compilation albums
Benny Goodman albums